Nils Egerbrandt (born 11 May 1926 in Stockholm, died 4 February 2005) was a Swedish comic creator who created a few children's comics in the 1950s, such as Olli, about an adventurous eskimo boy.

Later, he took over the popular Swedish comic strip 91:an from Rudolf Petersson, which he continued to work with until his death in 2005.

External links
Nils Egerbrandt info from the Lambiek Comiclopedia of Artists

1926 births
2005 deaths
Artists from Stockholm
Swedish cartoonists
Swedish children's writers